The Mercedes-Benz G500 4×4² (or G550 4×4² in the United States) is a special edition of the W-463 Mercedes-Benz G-Class (1990–2018), built with portal gear axles and much larger wheels and tires, for greatly increased off-road capability. In production since 2015, the model combines the body of a regular long-wheelbase Mercedes G-wagen with the portal axles with hub gearing of the much larger Mercedes-Benz G63 AMG 6x6. In addition to the greatly increased ground clearance, the G500 4×4² version also has significantly wider tracks, compared to regular G-Class models.

Fitted with a twin-turbo V8 engine with up to 416 HP, the vehicle stands out by combining Humvee-like off-road specifications with sportscar performance, as well as being one of the very few production cars equipped with portal axles / geared hubs.

History

Mercedes-Benz initially showed the G500 4×4² to the public as a concept car, called "Extreme-G". One reason the concept was developed was due to the high demand for the G-Class — in 2014 the G-Class sold over 14,000 units, which is a lot for such an expensive type of vehicle, and with high profit margins to boot. As a result, a considerable budget for low-volume derivatives was authorized. Positive response to this show car helped endorse the development of a series production version. The car was launched at the Geneva motor show and brought into production in 2015 

Though initially not available, the car was introduced to the U.S. market as a 2017 model – called the G550 4x4² – at an introduction price around $200,000. In spite of the difference in designation, it has the same drivetrain as the global version.

Features and specifications
The special axles and wheels are complemented by suspension with dual spring and shock damper struts with adjustable damping, on all corners. The car features very aggressive styling, that uses the front fascia copied from the G63 and G65 AMG, and dual side-pipe exhausts that exit ahead of the rear wheels on both flanks. On the inside, the car offers comfort and materials similar to a luxury saloon.

Compared to the already very robust standard G550, the 4×4² still offers much more of every off-road specification:  of extra ground-clearance,  of additional wading depth, a 21.6-degree steeper approach-angle, 23.4° greater breakover-, and 13.4° extra departure-angle. The Mercedes 4×4² beats the Hummer H1 on paper in almost every off-road measurement — except for traversing a slope. The 4×4² is limited to a 28.4° bank-angle, compared with the Humvee's 30°.

See also
Mercedes-Benz G-Class
Mercedes-Benz GL-Class
Portal axle
Mercedes-AMG G65 AMG (another special G-Class version of the 2010s)

References

Mercedes-Benz G-Class
G500 4x4²